Republic road I-8 is a major road in Southern Bulgaria. It runs between Kalotina, at the border with Serbia, and the Kapitan Andreevo border crossing to Turkey. Most of it provides one driving lane per direction. Road I-8 follows European route E80 in its entire length.

Description
Road I-8 begins from Kalotina checkpoint, at the border with Serbia. The road bypasses the cities of Dragoman and Slivnitsa. Between Slivnitsa and Sofia, the road runs as a 4-lane single-carriageway. Kalotina motorway is planned to replace and supersede I-8 between Sofia and the Serbian border. 

Road I-8 joins the northern arc of Sofia ring road and then it shares 6 km with Trakia motorway (A1). At Novi Han, road I-8 leaves the motorway and takes a steep climb to Vakarel. Then, the road bypasses Ihtiman and Kostenets, from where it follows the Maritsa river.

It goes through Pazardzhik and Plovdiv, the second largest city in the country. Then, the road runs towards Haskovo and Svilengrad. The road ends at the Kapitan Andreevo border crossing to Turkey.

Trakia motorway supersedes I-8 between Sofia and Orizovo, and Maritsa motorway (A4) supersedes it between Orizovo and the Turkish border.

References

External links
Road network of Bulgaria at RIA

Roads in Bulgaria